The Qizilsu or Kyzylsu is a river that rises on the southern slopes of the Vakhsh Range in the north-east of Tajikistan's Khatlon Region and runs south-west until joining the Panj on the border with Afghanistan. It merges with the Yakhsu (Akhshu) as a major left tributary south of the town of Kulyab. It irrigates the cotton-growing Qizilsu Valley between Kulob and Panj in the south-east of Khatlon Province. It is not the Kyzyl-Suu River that rises in Kyrgyzstan and flows through Tajikistan as Surkhob, then Vakhsh, following a course north-west of Qizilsu.

References

Rivers of Tajikistan
Khatlon Region